Herman B. Leonard is an American economist, currently the George F. Baker, Jr. Professor at of Public Management at Harvard Business School and Eliot I. Snider and Family Professor of Business Administration at John F. Kennedy School of Government.

He received his PhD in economics in 1979 from Harvard.

Career
He is a member of the board of directors of Harvard Pilgrim Health Care. He was formerly a member of the board of directors of the ACLU of Massachusetts, the Hitachi Foundation, the Massachusetts Health and Education Facilities Authority, and of Civic Investments, a nonprofit organization that assists charitable enterprises with capital financing; a member of the Research and Education Advisory Panel of the General Accounting Office; a member of the Massachusetts Performance Enhancement Commission; and a member of the Alaska Governor's Council on Economic Policy.

References

Year of birth missing (living people)
Living people
Harvard Business School faculty
American economists
Harvard Kennedy School faculty
Harvard University alumni